Śląsk Świętochłowice (full name: Miejski Klub Sportowy Śląsk Świętochłowice) is a Polish sports club based in Świętochłowice, Upper Silesia, known for its motorcycle speedway and football teams.

Name
Its name comes from the region of Silesia (Polish: Śląsk), in which it is located. Its full name Miejski Klub Sportowy Śląsk Świętochłowice means Silesia Świętochłowice City Sports Club.

Football section

History
The club was founded in February 1920, during the hectic months of the post-World War I period, when the Allied Powers were hesitating about the future fate of the industrial region of Upper Silesia. Śląsk's first, historic game occurred on 21 March 1920 against Polonia Bytom (2–1).

In 1921, when it turned out that Świętochłowice and surrounding areas would belong to reborn independent Poland, Śląsk's football team was strengthened by several players of a German-minority team SV 1913. This was a huge boost, and after a few years, in late 1927, Świętochłowice's side was promoted to the Polish top division.

The 1928 season was a failure. Out of 15 teams, Śląsk was placed on 14th position, with only 12 points (5 victories, 2 ties, goals 29–86). Relegation meant playing in Silesian A-Class, the strongest regional league in Poland. Relegation was not regarded by club's officials as a tragedy. Śląsk was a poor team, and playing in the National League was very expensive. Club simply had no money to travel to Lwów, Poznań or Toruń.

After a few years, in mid-1934, Śląsk won the Silesian League games. Then, in regional qualifiers it beat Unia Sosnowiec and Grzegorzecki Kraków. Final stage was a central tournament. There, after beating Śmigły Wilno, 5–1 and 2–0, as well as Naprzód Lipiny, 0–0 and 2–1, Śląsk was promoted to the Polish top division.

The 1935 season was a good one. Świętochłowice's side was placed on 5th position (among 11 teams), with 22 points and goals difference 34–40. Śląsk was the team of its own turf, at home winning for 8 times and losing twice. Next, 1936 season was much worse. Śląsk was placed on 9th (last but one) position which meant relegation (only 11 points, goals 21–40). Świętochłowice's favorites financial situation was much better than in 1928. Club was sponsored by "Florian" steelworks, its best players were Hubert Gad and Ewald Cebula, who also represented Poland.

In mid-1938 Śląsk won the Silesian League as well as regional qualifiers (against Legia Poznań and Gryf Toruń). However, in a national competition, the team was 3rd, after Garbarnia Kraków and Union Touring Łódź and ahead of Policyjny KS Łuck.

Next year was again marked by high hopes. Świętochłowice's favorites, looking stronger than ever before, won the Silesian League (mid-1939), then routed the teams of Fablok Chrzanów, 4–0 and 1–1, and Unia Sosnowiec 4–0 and 2–0, to qualify to the national qualifying tournament. Unfortunately, this competition was not finished due to the German invasion of Poland, which started the Second World War. In August 1939 Śląsk managed to play only two games—at home with Śmigły Wilno (2–1) and away with Junak Drohobycz (0–0).

During the war, the German occupiers allowed those Silesians who signed the Volksliste to participate in the games of the Gauliga Schlesien, later the Gauliga Oberschlesien. Śląsk, with its name changed to TuS Schwientochlowitz, was basically the same team as in 1939, plus Walter Brom, a very talented goalkeeper of Ruch Chorzów. However, as time went by, more and more players were conscripted to the Wehrmacht, among them Ewald Cebula, who ended up in German units in Italy.

After the war, in spite of the dedication of its activists, Śląsk's football team never managed to return to the Polish top division.

Speedway section

History
In 1951, a motorcycle speedway section was founded and during the 1953 Polish speedway season the team from Stal Ostrów Wlkp moved to Świętochłowice to compete in the Team Speedway Polish Championship. After relegation in 1955, the club bounced back by winning the in Second division south in 1956.

In the late 1960s the club began to compete at the top level, they won the 1968 second division and then achiveved their greatest feat to date, when winning the silver medal in the team championship during the 1969. The success was repeated when winning another silver medal in 1970. 

One of their riders Paweł Waloszek won the Golden Helmet in 1968 and finished second in the 1970 Individual Speedway World Championship, behind the legendary Ivan Mauger. Another rider Jan Mucha, won the 1970 Golden Helmet. Two more major medals were won in 1972 (bronze) and 1973 (silver).

In 1984, the team won the second division but following the 1985 season it was relegated from the top division, and following the 1996 season the team withdrew due to financial difficulties. In 1998–2002 the team was revamped and competed in the second and third tiers, eventually withdrawing once again. In 2015, a former rider of the team, Krzysztof Bas, became the head coach.

As of 2023, the club does not participate in professional league competitions and only focuses on youth training.

Notable riders

Honours

References

See also
 Sport in Poland

 
Association football clubs established in 1920
Polish speedway teams
Sport in Silesian Voivodeship
1920 establishments in Poland